was a Japanese educator, philosopher, writer, entrepreneur and samurai who founded Keio University, the newspaper Jiji-Shinpō, and the Institute for Study of Infectious Diseases. 

Fukuzawa was an early advocate for reform in Japan. His ideas about the organization of government and the structure of social institutions made a lasting impression on a rapidly changing Japan during the Meiji period. He appears on the current 10,000-Japanese yen banknote.

Early life 

Fukuzawa Yukichi was born into an impoverished low-ranking samurai (military nobility) family of the Okudaira Clan of Nakatsu Domain (present-day Ōita, Kyushu) in 1835. His family lived in Osaka, the main trading center for Japan at the time. His family was poor following the early death of his father, who was also a Confucian scholar. At the age of 5 he started Han learning, and by the time he turned 14, he had studied major writings such as the Analects, Tao Te Ching, Zuo Zhuan and Zhuangzi. Fukuzawa was greatly influenced by his lifelong teacher, Shōzan Shiraishi, who was a scholar of Confucianism and Han learning. Yukichi turned 19 in 1854, shortly after the Perry Expedition's arrival in Japan marking the beginning of the opening of Japan to trade via Gunboat diplomacy. As the family patriarch Fukuzawa's brother asked him to travel to Nagasaki, where the Dutch colony at Dejima was located, in order to enter a school of Dutch studies (rangaku).  He instructed Yukichi to learn Dutch so that he might study European cannon designs and gunnery.

Fukuzawa’s early life consisted of the dull and backbreaking work typical of a lower-level samurai in Japan during the Tokugawa period. Although Fukuzawa did travel to Nagasaki, his stay was brief as he quickly began to outshine his host in Nagasaki, Okudaira Iki. Okudaira planned to get rid of Fukuzawa by writing a letter saying that Fukuzawa's mother was ill.  Seeing through the fake letter, Fukuzawa planned to travel to Edo and continue his studies there, since he would be unable to do so in his home domain of Nakatsu. However, upon his return to Osaka, his brother persuaded him to stay and enroll at the Tekijuku school run by physician and rangaku scholar Ogata Kōan. Fukuzawa studied at Tekijuku for three years and became fully proficient in the Dutch language. In 1858, he was appointed the official Dutch teacher of Nakatsu, and was sent to Edo to teach the family's vassals there.

The following year, Japan opened up three of its ports to American and European ships, and Fukuzawa, intrigued with Western civilization, traveled to Kanagawa to see them. When he arrived, he discovered that virtually all of the European merchants there were speaking English rather than Dutch. He then began to study English, but at that time, English-Japanese interpreters were rare and dictionaries nonexistent, so his studies were slow.

In 1859, the Tokugawa shogunate sent their first diplomatic mission to the United States. Fukuzawa volunteered his services to Admiral Kimura Yoshitake. Kimura's ship, the Kanrin Maru, arrived in San Francisco, California, in 1860. The delegation stayed in the city for a month, during which time Fukuzawa had himself photographed with an American girl, and also found a Webster's Dictionary, from which he began serious study of the English language.

Political movements 

Upon his return in 1860, Fukuzawa became an official translator for the Tokugawa shogunate. Shortly afterwards he brought out his first publication, an English-Japanese dictionary which he called "Kaei Tsūgo" (translated from a Chinese-English dictionary) which was a beginning for his series of later books. In 1862, he visited Europe as one of the two English translators in the First Japanese Embassy to Europe. During its year in Europe, the Embassy conducted negotiations with France, England, the Netherlands, Prussia, and finally Russia. In Russia, the embassy attempted unsuccessfully to negotiate for the southern end of Sakhalin (in Japanese Karafuto), a long-standing source of dispute between the two countries.

The information collected during these travels resulted in his famous work Seiyō Jijō, which he published in ten volumes in 1867, 1868 and 1870. The books describe western culture and institutions in simple, easy to understand terms, and they became immediate best-sellers. Fukuzawa was soon regarded as the foremost expert on western civilization, leading him to conclude that his mission in life was to educate his countrymen in new ways of thinking in order to enable Japan to resist European imperialism.

In 1868 he changed the name of the school he had established to teach Dutch to Keio Gijuku, and from then on devoted all his time to education. He also added Public speaking to the educational system's curriculum. While Keiō's initial identity was that of a private school of Western studies (Keio-gijuku), it expanded and established its first university faculty in 1890. Under the name Keio-Gijuku University, it became a leader in Japanese higher education.

Fukuzawa was also a strong advocate for women’s rights. He often spoke up in favor of equality between husbands and wives, the education of girls as well as boys, and the equal love of daughters and sons. At the same time, he called attention to harmful practices such as women’s inability to own property in their own name and the familial distress that took place when married men took mistresses. However, even Fukuzawa was not willing to propose completely equal rights for men and women; only for husbands and wives. He also stated in his 1899 book New Greater Learning for Women that a good marriage was always the best outcome for a young woman, and according to some of Fukuzawa's personal letters, he discouraged his friends from sending their daughters on to higher education so that they would not become less desirable marriage candidates. While some of Yukichi’s other proposed reforms, such as education reforms, found an eager audience, his ideas about women received a less enthusiastic reception.

Death 
After suffering a stroke on January 25, 1901, Fukuzawa Yukichi died on February 3. He was buried at Zenpuku-ji, in the Azabu area of Tokyo. Alumni of Keio-Gijuku University hold a ceremony there every year on February 3.

Works 
Fukuzawa's writings may have been the foremost of the Edo period and Meiji period. They played a large role in the introduction of Western culture into Japan.

English-Japanese Dictionary 
In 1860, he published English-Japanese Dictionary ("Zōtei Kaei Tsūgo"). It was his first publication. He bought English-Chinese Dictionary ("Kaei Tsūgo") in San Francisco in 1860. He translated it to Japanese and he added the Japanese translations to the original textbook. In his book, he invented the new Japanese characters VU to represent the pronunciation of VU, and VA to represent the pronunciation of VA.

All the Countries of the World, for Children Written in Verse 
His famous textbook Sekai Kunizukushi ("All the Countries of the World, for Children Written in Verse", 1869) became a best seller and was used as an official school textbook.  His inspiration for writing the books came when he tried to teach world geography to his sons.  At the time there were no textbooks on the subject, so he decided to write one himself.  He started by buying a few Japanese geography books for children, named Miyakoji ("City roads") and Edo hōgaku ("Tokyo maps"), and practiced reading them aloud. He then wrote Sekai Kunizukushi in six volumes in the same lyrical style.  The first volume covered Asia, the second Africa, the third Europe, the fourth South America, and the fifth both North America and Australia. The sixth volume was an appendix that gave an introduction to world  geography.

An Encouragement of Learning 

Influenced by the 1835 and 1856 editions of Elements of Moral Science by Brown University President Francis Wayland, from 1872-76 Fukuzawa published 17 volumes of Gakumon no Susume (or more idiomatically "On Studying").  Through these writings, Fukuzawa develops his views on the importance of equality of opportunity as a principle, explores his understanding of the principle, and stresses that education is the key to taking best advantage of 
the principle and achieving greatness. For these reasons, he was an avid supporter of public schools and believed in a firm mental foundation through learning and studiousness. Fukuzawa also advocated in these writings his most lasting motto, "national independence through personal independence." By creating a self-determining social morality for a Japan still reeling from both the political upheavals wrought by the unwanted end to its isolationism and the cultural upheavals caused by the inundation of so much novelty in products, methods, and ideas, Fukuzawa hoped to instill a sense of personal strength among the people of Japan so they could build a nation to rival all others. To his understanding, Western nations had become more powerful than other regions because their societies fostered education, individualism (independence), competition and exchange of ideas.

An Outline of a Theory of Civilization 

Fukuzawa published many influential essays and critical works. A particularly prominent example is Bunmeiron no Gairyaku published in 1875, in which he details his own theory of civilization. It was influenced by Histoire de la civilisation en Europe (1828; Eng. trans in 1846) by François Guizot and History of Civilization in England (1872–1873, 2nd London ed.) by Henry Thomas Buckle. According to Fukuzawa, civilization is relative to time and circumstance, as well in comparison. For example, at the time China was relatively civilized in comparison to some African colonies, and European nations were the most civilized of all.

Colleagues in the Meirokusha intellectual society shared many of Fukuzawa's views, which he published in his contributions to Meiroku zasshi (Meiji Six Magazine), a scholarly journal he helped publish. In his books and journals, he often wrote about the word "civilization" and what it meant. He advocated a move toward "civilization", by which he meant material and spiritual well-being, which elevated human life to a "higher plane". Because material and spiritual well-being corresponded to knowledge and "virtue", to "move toward civilization" was to advance and pursue knowledge and virtue themselves. He contended that people could find the answer to their life or their present situation from "civilization." Furthermore, the difference between the weak and the powerful and large and small was just a matter of difference between their knowledge and education.

He argued that Japan should not import guns and materials. Instead it should support the acquisition of knowledge, which would eventually take care of the material necessities. He talked of the Japanese concept of being practical or pragmatic (実学, jitsugaku) and the building of things that are basic and useful to other people. In short, to Fukuzawa, "civilization" essentially meant the furthering of knowledge and education.

Legacy 

Fukuzawa's most important contribution to the reformation effort, though, came in the form of a newspaper called  ("Current Events"), which he started in 1882, after being prompted by Inoue Kaoru, Ōkuma Shigenobu, and Itō Hirobumi to establish a strong influence among the people, and in particular to transmit to the public the government's views on the projected national assembly, and as reforms began, Fukuzawa, whose fame was already unquestionable, began production of Jiji Shinpo, which received wide circulation, encouraging the people to enlighten themselves and to adopt a moderate political attitude towards the change that was being engineered within the social and political structures of Japan. He translated many books and journals into Japanese on a wide variety of subjects, including chemistry, the arts, military and society, and published many books (in multiple volumes) and journals himself describing Western society, his own philosophy and change, etc.

Fukuzawa was one of the most influential people ever that helped Japan modernize into the country it is today. He never accepted any high position and remained a normal Japanese citizen for his whole life. By the time of his death, he was revered as one of the founders of modern Japan. All of his work was written and was released at a critical juncture in the Japanese society and uncertainty for the Japanese people about their future after the signing of the Unequal treaties, their realization in the weakness of the Japanese government at the time (Tokugawa Shogunate) and its inability to repel the American and European influence. It should also be noted that there were bands of samurai that forcefully opposed the Americans and Europeans and their friends through murder and destruction. Fukuzawa was in danger of his life as a samurai group killed one of his colleagues for advocating policies like those of Fukuzawa. Fukuzawa wrote at a time when the Japanese people were undecided on whether they should be bitter about the American and European forced treaties and imperialism, or to understand the West and move forward. Fukuzawa greatly aided the ultimate success of the pro-modernization forces.

Fukuzawa appears on the current 10,000-yen banknote and has been compared to Benjamin Franklin in the United States. Franklin appears on the similarly-valued $100 bill. Although all other figures appearing on Japanese banknotes changed when the recent redesign was released, Fukuzawa remained on the 10,000-yen note.

Yukichi Fukuzawa's former residence in the city of Nakatsu in Ōita Prefecture is a Nationally Designated Cultural Asset. The house and the Yukichi Fukuzawa Memorial Hall are the major tourist attractions of this city.

Yukichi Fukuzawa was a firm believer that Western education surpassed Japan's.  However, he did not like the idea of parliamentary debates.  As early as 1860, Yukichi Fukuzawa traveled to Europe and the United States. He believed that the problem in Japan was the undervalued mathematics and science.  Also, these suffered from a "lack of the idea of independence".  The Japanese conservatives were not happy about Fukuzawa's view of Western education.  Since he was a family friend of conservatives, he took their stand to heart.  Fukuzawa later came to state that he went a little too far.

One word sums up his entire theme and that is "independence".  Yukichi Fukuzawa believed that national independence was the framework to society in the West.  However, to achieve this independence, as well as personal independence, Fukuzawa advocated Western learning.  He believed that public virtue would increase as people became more educated.

Bibliography

Original Japanese books 
 English-Japanese dictionary (増訂華英通語 Zōtei Kaei Tsūgo, 1860)
 Things western (西洋事情 Seiyō Jijō, 1866, 1868 and 1870)
 Rifle instruction book (雷銃操法 Raijyū Sōhō, 1867)
 Guide to travel in the western world (西洋旅案内 Seiyō Tabiannai, 1867)
 Our eleven treaty countries (条約十一国記 Jyōyaku Jyūichi-kokki, 1867)
 Western ways of living: food, clothes, housing (西洋衣食住 Seiyō Isyokujyū, 1867)
 Handbook for soldiers (兵士懐中便覧 Heishi Kaicyū Binran, 1868)
 Illustrated book of physical sciences (訓蒙窮理図解 Kinmō Kyūri Zukai, 1868)
 Outline of the western art of war (洋兵明鑑 Yōhei Meikan, 1869)
 Pocket almanac of the world (掌中万国一覧 Shōcyū Bankoku-Ichiran, 1869)
 English parliament (英国議事院談 Eikoku Gijiindan, 1869)
 Sino-British diplomatic relations (清英交際始末 Shin-ei Kosai-shimatsu, 1869)
 All the countries of the world, for children written in verse (世界国尽 Sekai Kunizukushi, 1869)
 Daily lesson for children (ひびのおしえ Hibi no Oshie, 1871) - These books were written for Fukuzawa's first son Ichitarō and second son Sutejirō.
 Book of reading and penmanship for children (啓蒙手習の文 Keimō Tenarai-no-Fumi, 1871)
 Encouragement of learning (学問のすゝめ Gakumon no Susume, 1872–1876)
 Junior book of ethics with many tales from western lands (童蒙教草 Dōmō Oshie-Gusa, 1872)
 Deformed girl (かたわ娘 Katawa Musume, 1872)
 Explanation of the new calendar (改暦弁 Kaireki-Ben, 1873)
 Bookkeeping (帳合之法 Chōai-no-Hō, 1873)
 Maps of Japan for children (日本地図草紙 Nihon Chizu Sōshi, 1873)
 Elementary reader for children (文字之教 Moji-no-Oshie, 1873)
 How to hold a conference (会議弁 Kaigi-Ben, 1874)
 An Outline of a Theory of Civilization (文明論之概略 Bunmeiron no Gairyaku, 1875)
 Independence of the scholar's mind (学者安心論 Gakusya Anshinron, 1876)
 On decentralization of power, advocating less centralized government in Japan (分権論 Bunkenron, 1877)
 Popular economics (民間経済録 Minkan Keizairoku, 1877)
 Collected essays of Fukuzawa (福澤文集 Fukuzawa Bunsyū, 1878)
 On currency (通貨論 Tsūkaron, 1878)
 Popular discourse on people's rights (通俗民権論 Tsūzoku Minkenron, 1878)
 Popular discourse on national rights (通俗国権論 Tsūzoku Kokkenron, 1878)
 Transition of people's way of thinking (民情一新 Minjyō Isshin, 1879)
 On national diet (国会論 Kokkairon, 1879)
 Commentary on the current problems (時事小言 Jiji Shōgen, 1881)
 On general trends of the times (時事大勢論 Jiji Taiseiron, 1882)
 On the imperial household (帝室論 Teishitsuron, 1882)
 On armament (兵論 Heiron, 1882)
 On moral training (徳育如何 Tokuiku-Ikan, 1882)
 On the independence of learning (学問之独立 Gakumon-no Dokuritsu, 1883)
 On the national conscription (全国徴兵論 Zenkoku Cyōheiron, 1884)
 Popular discourse on foreign diplomacy (通俗外交論 Tsūzoku Gaikōron, 1884)
 On Japanese womanhood (日本婦人論 Nihon Fujinron, 1885)
 On men's moral life (士人処世論 Shijin Syoseiron, 1885)
 On moral conduct (品行論 Hinkōron, 1885)
 On association of men and women (男女交際論 Nannyo Kosairon, 1886)
 On Japanese manhood (日本男子論 Nihon Nanshiron, 1888)
 On reverence for the Emperor (尊王論 Sonnōron, 1888)
 Future of the Diet; Origin of the difficulty in the Diet; Word on the public security; On land tax (国会の前途 Kokkai-no Zento; Kokkai Nankyoku-no Yurai; Chian-Syōgen; Chisoron, 1892)
 On business (実業論 Jitsugyōron, 1893)
 One hundred discourses of Fukuzawa (福翁百話 Fukuō Hyakuwa, 1897)
 Foreword to the collected works of Fukuzawa (福澤全集緒言 Fukuzawa Zensyū Cyogen, 1897)
 Fukuzawa sensei's talk on the worldly life (福澤先生浮世談 Fukuzawa Sensei Ukiyodan, 1898)
 Discourses of study for success (修業立志編 Syūgyō Rittishihen, 1898)
 Autobiography of Fukuzawa Yukichi (福翁自伝 Fukuō Jiden, 1899)
 Reproof of "the essential learning for women"; New essential learning for women (女大学評論 Onnadaigaku Hyōron; 新女大学 Shin-Onnadaigaku, 1899)
 More discourses of Fukuzawa (福翁百余話 Fukuō Hyakuyowa, 1901)
 Commentary on the national problems of 1877; Spirit of manly defiance (明治十年丁丑公論 Meiji Jyūnen Teicyū Kōron; 瘠我慢の説 Yasegaman-no Setsu, 1901)

English translations 

 The Thought of Fukuzawa series, (Paperback) Keio University Press
 vol.1 
 vol.2 
 vol.3 
 Vol.4 The Autobiography of Fukuzawa Yukichi. Revised translation and with an introduction by Helen Ballhatchet.

See also 

Jiji Shinpō
Keio-Gijuku University
List of motifs on banknotes
Nakae Chōmin
Natsume Sōseki
Susumu Nishibe
Tsuneari Fukuda
Yamamoto Tsunetomo
Yukio Mishima
Zenpuku-ji

Notes

References 

 - French version (Archive)

Further reading 
 
Hiruta, Kei (2023). "Fukuzawa Yukichi's Liberal Nationalism". American Political Science Review

 Lefebvre, Isabelle. "La révolution chez Fukuzawa et la notion de jitsugaku Fukuzawa Yukichi sous le regard de Maruyama Masao" (Archive). Cipango. 19 | 2012 : Le Japon et le fait colonial II. pp. 79-91.
 Maruyama, Masao (丸山眞男). "Introduction aux recherches philosophiques de Fukuzawa Yukichi" (Archive). Cipango. 19 | 2012 : Le Japon et le fait colonial II. pp. 191-217. Translated from Japanese by Isabelle Lefebvre.
 Original version: Maruyama, Masao. "Fukuzawa ni okeru jitsugaku no tenkai. Fukuzawa Yukichi no tetsugaku kenkyū josetsu" (福沢に於ける「実学」の展開、福沢諭吉の哲学研究序説), March 1947, in Maruyama Masao shū (丸山眞男集), vol. xvi, Tōkyō, Iwanami Shoten, (1997), 2004, pp. 108-131.
(in French) Fukuzawa Yukichi, L’Appel à l’étude, complete edition, translated from Japanese, annotated and presented by Christian Galan, Paris, Les Belles Lettres, april 2018, 220 p.

External links 

 Fukuzawa, Yukichi | Portraits of Modern Japanese Historical Figures (National Diet Library)
 "Encouragement for Learning" (Gakumon no Susume) by Fukuzawa Yukichi (Part One, English Translation)
 E-texts of Fukuzawa's works at Aozora Bunko 
 Gakumon no Susume, first edition in the Database of Pre-Modern Japanese Works (National Institute of Japanese Literature)

1835 births
1901 deaths
Atheist feminists
Japanese atheists
19th-century Japanese educators
Liberalism in Japan
Japanese classical liberals
Japanese feminists
Japanese journalists
Japanese writers
Japanese translators
Keio University
Male feminists
Meiji Restoration
People from Nakatsu, Ōita
People of Meiji-period Japan
University and college founders
Writers from Osaka
Members of the First Japanese Embassy to Europe
Members of the Japanese Embassy to the United States
Japanese magazine founders